Ked itch is a cutaneous condition caused by sheep ked (Melophagus ovinus) which feed by thrusting their sharp mouth parts into the skin and sucking blood.

See also 
 Skin lesion

References 

Parasitic infestations, stings, and bites of the skin